Sorokino is a rural locality (a village) in Muromtsevskoye Rural Settlement, Sudogodsky District, Vladimir Oblast, Russia. The population was 2 as of 2010.

Geography 
Sorokino is located 8 km west of Sudogda (the district's administrative centre) by road. Kostino is the nearest rural locality.

References 

Rural localities in Sudogodsky District